My 30 Work Days: Diary of Shooting A Simple Life is a book published by Hong Kong actor and singer Andy Lau extracted from diaries and notes that he wrote while shooting the 2011 film, A Simple Life. Lau's 30 personal diaries and notes details his observations and thoughts about issues raised by the story of the film, in particular appreciation of and care for the elderly. The book also contains 300 behind the scene photographs taken by Lau and his colleagues. The book was published on 27 February 2012 by Ming Pao Publications in Hong Kong.

Content
 Thoughts and recommendations by cast and crew members of A Simple Life including director Ann Hui, producer Roger Lee and actresses Deanie Ip and Qin Hailu
 Lau's 30 daily diary entries
 Andy Lau exclusive photo collection
 A Simple Life production stills
 Decryption of the story of A Simple Life with photos and sections of the screenplay

Table of contents
 Recommendations
 Preface
 Notes
 Photographs
 A Simple Life script excerpts

Background
Lau's 30 personal entries were originally meant to be blog entries that he intended to share on his Andy World Club official fan club website. Lau also specifically stated the book is not written for his film, A Simple Life, nor is it a promotion for the film as he originally had no intention in publishing it. Instead, he only wanted to journal down his encounters while working on the film, and how the film influenced his feelings and emotions.

References

External links
My 30 Work Days at Google Books

Hong Kong non-fiction books
2012 non-fiction books
Diaries
Books of photographs
Chinese-language books